Year 1240 (MCCXL) was a leap year starting on Sunday (link will display the full calendar) of the Julian calendar.

Events 
 By place 

 Europe 
 May 24 – Duke Skule Bårdsson, claimant to the Norwegian throne, is defeated by King Haakon IV (the Old) and his supporters. He seeks refuge in Elgeseter Priory in Trondheim, and Haakon burns down the monastery, in which Skule is burned alive. Haakon becomes the undisputed ruler; this ends the civil war era in Norway, after 110 years.
 July 15 – Battle of the Neva:  A Swedish army under Bishop Thomas sails up the Gulf of Finland in their longboats. They proceed into the Neva River with the aim of seizing control over Lake Ladoga and from there, striking at the city of Novgorod. Prince Alexander rallies his druzhina comparable to the 'household' of western European countries, and decisively routes the Swedish forces, saving the Novgorod Republic from a full-scale enemy invasion from the North. As a result, Alexander wins his first military victory at the age of 19 and receives the title of Nevsky.
 Winter – Alexander Nevsky quarrels with the Kievan nobles (boyars) and merchants of Novgorod, probably about peaceful trade with the westerners. He is banished, along with his mother, wife, and his druzhina to take up residence in the region around Moscow, a minor town on the western border of the Principality of Vladimir-Suzdal.
 Reconquista: King Sancho II (the Pious) conquers the city of Ayamonte from the Almoravids, securing the Portuguese position in Al-Andalus.

 Africa 
 Summer – As-Salih Ayyub becomes ruler of Egypt, after deposing his half-brother Al-Adil II. Meanwhile, other members of the Ayyubid Dynasty, are conspiring to depose him and replace him with his uncle, As-Salih Ismail. During his reign, As-Salih begins buying large numbers of Kipchak slaves, to form an elite core in the Egyptian army, known as Mamluks.

 Levant 
 October 10 – Richard of Cornwall, brother of King Henry III, arrives at Acre for a pilgrimage to Jerusalem. His pilgrimage has the approval of Emperor Frederick II – who is married to his younger sister, Isabella of England, and gives him the task to make arrangements with the Military Orders. On his arrival, Richard travels to Ascalon – where he is met by ambassadors from As-Salih Ayyub. As a negotiator, he is successful in the release of prisoners captured at Gaza (see 1239), and he also assists with the building of the citadel in Ascalon.

 Mongol Empire 
 Winter – The Mongols under Batu Khan cross the frozen Dnieper River and lay siege to the city of Kiev. On December 6, the walls are rendered rubble by Chinese catapults and the Mongols pour into the city. Brutal hand-to-hand street fighting occurs, the Kievans are eventually forced to fall back to the central parts of the city. Many people take refuge in the Church of the Blessed Virgin. As scores of terrified Kievans climb onto the Church's upper balcony to shield themselves from Mongol arrows, their collective weight strain its infrastructure, causing the roof to collapse and crush countless citizens under its weight. Of a total population of 50,000, all but 2,000 are massacred.

 By topic 

 Religion 
 June 12 – The Disputation of Paris begins at the court of King Louis IX (the Saint), where four rabbis defend the Talmud against Nicholas Donin's accusations of blasphemy.
 Pope Gregory IX authorizes a Crusade against Novgorod. Hoping that the Kievan Rus' will be too preoccupied dealing with the raiding Mongols to the east to defend.

Births 
 May 2 – Du Zong (or Zhao Qi), Chinese emperor (d. 1274)
 September 29 – Margaret, queen of Scotland (d. 1275)
 Abraham Abulafia, Moorish Jewish philosopher (d. 1292)
 Afonso Mendes de Melo, Portuguese nobleman (d. 1280)
 Agostino Novello, Italian priest and prior general (d. 1309)
 Albert II (the Degenerate), German nobleman (d. 1314)
 Andrea dei Conti, Italian nobleman and priest (d. 1302)
 Arnaldus de Villa Nova, Spanish physician (d. 1311)
 Balian of Ibelin, Cypriot nobleman and knight (d. 1302)
 Beka I Jaqeli, Georgian prince (mtavari) (d. 1306)
 Benedict XI, pope of the Catholic Church (d. 1304)
 Conrad I, German nobleman and regent (d. 1304)
 Conrad of Lichtenberg, German bishop (d. 1299)
 Daumantas of Pskov, Lithuanian prince (d. 1299)
 Frederick III, German nobleman and knight (d. 1302)
 Giovanni Pelingotto, Italian hermit and monk (d. 1304)
 Henry VI, count of Luxembourg and Arlon (d. 1288)
 Jean d'Eppe, French nobleman and knight (d. 1293)
 Magnus III (Birgersson), king of Sweden (d. 1290)
 Peter III, king of Aragon and Valencia (d. 1285)
 Siger of Brabant, French philosopher (d. 1284)
 Simon VI, English nobleman and knight (d. 1271)
 Simone Ballachi, Italian monk and friar (d. 1319)

Deaths 
 January 23 – Albert of Pisa, Italian Franciscan friar 
 February 24 – Egidia de Lacy, Norman noblewoman
 March 6 – Sylvester of Assisi, Italian priest (b. 1175)
 April 11 – Llywelyn the Great, king of Gwynedd
 May 24 – Skule Bårdsson, Norwegian nobleman
 May 27 – William de Warenne, English nobleman 
 July 22 – John de Lacy, English nobleman (b.1192)
 July 24 – Conrad of Thuringia, German Grand Master
 August 14 – Ludmilla of Bohemia, duchess of Bavaria
 August 31 – Raymond Nonnatus, Spanish cardinal 
 October 13 – Malik Altunia, Indian governor and ruler 
 November 16  
 Edmund of Abingdon, English archbishop (b. 1174)
 Ibn Arabi, Andalusian philosopher and poet (b. 1165)
 December 6 – Constance, queen of Bohemia (b. 1180)
 Alan of Beccles, English clergyman and secretary (b. 1195)
 Alexander of Villedieu, French teacher and poet (b. 1175)
 Anastasia of Greater Poland, Polish noblewoman (b. 1164)
 Branca of Portugal, Portuguese princess  (infanta) (b. 1198)
 Caesarius of Heisterbach, German hagiographer (b. 1180)
 Conrad of Lichtenau, German nobleman and chronicler
 Fujiwara no Hideyoshi, Japanese waka poet (b. 1184)
 Germanus II (Nauplius), patriarch of Constantinople
 Guilhabert de Castres, French bishop and theologian 
 Hartmann I, German nobleman and knight (b. 1160)
 Hōjō Tokifusa, Japanese nobleman and regent (b. 1175)
 John FitzRobert, English nobleman and knight (b. 1190)
 Tbeli Abuserisdze, Georgian scholar and writer (b. 1190)
 Thomas Moulton, English nobleman, knight and admiral

References